Nothoscordum × borbonicum, also known as honeybells, fragrant false garlic and onion weed, is a bulbous perennial.  It has become naturalized as a nearly cosmopolitan weed. The whitish flowers are sweetly scented. It is a hybrid between N. entrerianum and N. gracile.

The binomial names Nothoscordum fragrans and Nothoscordum gracile have also been applied to this plant.

References

Nothoscordum borbonicum
Interspecific plant hybrids